Anamur Museum is a museum of archaeology and ethnography in Anamur ilçe (district) of Mersin Province, southern Turkey.

Location

History
But construction was delayed and  the museum building was opened in 1992. Anamur area is rich in archaeological remains. Up to the establishment of the museum the finds were displayed in other museums, notably in Silifke  and Alanya Museums. After 1992 Anamur based articles were returned to Anamur.

The building and the displayed items
The upper floor of the two storey building is reserved the administration, library, photo lab and a conference room. The archaeology and ethnography display halls as well as the stock room and the cafeteria are in the ground floor. In the museum section in addition to finds in Anamur area, the finds in Bozyazı and Aydıncık (ancient Nagidos and Kelenderis respectively) are also displayed. 
In the archaeology hall there are coins, mosaics, oil lamps ornaments and the like from the Roman Empire era and earlier.  Some examples in the ethnography hall  are carpets, various equipment about coffee treat, powder horn, swords, metallic cookware, copper caldron, clocks etc. There are 3470 archaeology items, 849 ethnography items, 7105 coins and 124 stamps.

External links
Virtual museum

References

Buildings and structures in Mersin Province
Anamur District
Archaeological museums in Turkey
1992 establishments in Turkey
Museums established in 1992
Museums in Mersin Province